Nakkirar may refer to:

 Nakkirar I, a Tamil poet of the Sangam period
 Nakkirar II, the medieval Tamil poet